Joe Greene (born February 15, 1986) in Brooklyn, New York but now resides and trains in Queens is a professional middleweight American boxer. At a height of 5'10 with a Southpaw stance, Greene has a professional record of 22 wins (14 KO's), 1 loss and 0 draws.

Amateur career
Greene was the  2004 National Golden Gloves Middleweight Champion.

Professional career
Greene fought his first professional bout on March 5, 2005 against Curtis Mullins. Greene won by technical knockout in the second round. On August 8, 2007 on ESPN's Wednesday Night Fights Greene fought Darryl Salmon for the NABA middleweight title, Greene won by knockout in the first round.

On February 23, 2008, Greene defeated Francisco Antonio Mora at Madison Square Garden by knockout in the tenth round.

On August 13, 2008, Greene moved down in weight to the junior middleweight division(154 lbs). He claimed the NABA junior middleweight title by outpointing Jose Miguel Torres. The fight was broadcast live by ESPN's Wednesday Night Fights.

On January 26, 2020, Greene announced that he would dedicate his 2-3 years to boxing. But he has not been seen on the ring since then

External links
 
Joe Greene's Official Myspace Page.
A Joe Greene blog

References

1986 births
Boxers from New York City
Living people
Middleweight boxers
Sportspeople from Brooklyn
American male boxers